Flowery Field is an area of Hyde, Greater Manchester, England.

It is a mainly residential area once dominated by Ashton Brothers Textile Mill.

Cricket
The area is home to Flowery Field Cricket Club, one of the foremost amateur clubs in the Tame Valley. They were champions of the Saddleworth and District Cricket League in 2003 and moved into the Lancashire County League for 2004 and then into the Greater Manchester Cricket League in 2016. An early member and very young player for Flowery Field Cricket Club was Warren Bradley who later played football for Manchester United and scored in the F.A. Cup.

Education
Schools in the area include Hyde High School and Flowery Field Primary School and Nursery.

Hyde Community College is a secondary school in the area. It is noted for its ICT teaching. The school has a rich history in the area and has been on its current site since the 1940s. As part of the governments building schools for the future programme, the school was completely rebuilt and was opened in November 2012.

Flowery Field infants and junior schools are now in a combined building on the original site which opened in January 2015.

Transport 
Flowery Field railway station is located on the Glossop/Hadfield Line, running from Manchester Piccadilly to Hadfield. Trains run in each direction at least twice per hour. In the peak times this increases to 3/4 every hour in each direction.

There is another station nearby, Hyde North railway station. Hyde North accommodates the Manchester Piccadilly to Rose Hill Marple line, which runs slightly less regularly than the Hadfield/Glossop line. There is no service from Hyde North on Sundays and in the evenings after 20:30.

Buses include the 330 Stockport to Ashton via Hyde and Woodley, Greater Manchester. This service is run by Stagecoach Manchester and operates every 8 mins each way 7am - 8pm Monday to Saturday and every 20 mins each way on Sundays and evenings past 8pm.

343 Runs from Hyde to Stalybridge via Dukinfield. This service is run by Stotts Coaches and Stagecoach Manchester and operates every 60 mins each way everyday from 7.30am - 11.30pm.

There are numerous other bus routes and services running throughout the region.

Facilities
Flowery Field Church is a Tudor Gothic style building, designed by the architect Thomas Worthington, and was completed in 1878. Thomas Ashton (who owned the cotton mill across the road) built the church at his own expense and donated it to the congregation as a sacred trust. During the build the congregation were tasked with raising £1000, which was a huge amount at that time. Upon completion Thomas Ashton then made a magnificent gesture by returning this sum on condition that the money be invested and the interest used to augment a Minister's stipend. The church still has weekly services and an active social calendar, and is open to any denomination as a Free Christian Fellowship 'We uphold the right of everyone to practise the Christian faith in their own personal way'.

There is also a local surestart/children's centre.

References

External links

 www.tameside.gov.uk

Areas of Greater Manchester
Hyde, Greater Manchester